Stanislav Valeryevich Detkov (born September 16, 1980) is a Russian snowboarder. He competed at the 2010 Winter Olympic Games in the "Men's Parallel Giant Slalom" and came 11th with a total time of 1:18:29.

References

References
 
 

1980 births
Living people
Russian male snowboarders
Olympic snowboarders of Russia
Snowboarders at the 2010 Winter Olympics
Snowboarders at the 2014 Winter Olympics